WHQG (102.9 FM, "102-9 The Hog") is an active rock radio station licensed to and serving the Milwaukee, Wisconsin area. The station is owned by the Milwaukee Radio Group subsidiary of Saga Communications.  Its studios (which are shared with the other four sister stations) and transmitter are located in Milwaukee's West Side.

History

Top 40 (1962-1972) 
The 102.9 frequency started out in 1962 as WRIT-FM, simulcasting its sister station's Top 40 format. In 1971, they became WFWO-FM (For Women Only), and played light adult contemporary music.

Country (1972-1987) 
The station flipped to country music on October 1, 1972 as WBCS. WBCS found success with the format, since they were the only country station in the market at the time (WMIL had switched to Top 40 as WZUU the year before).

Mainstream rock (1987-2005) 
WLZR succeeded WBCS-FM with a hard rock format on February 16, 1987. "Lazer 103" dominated the album-oriented rock market, such that competing station WQFM switched to smooth jazz in 1996. WLZR's longtime morning show of Bob and Brian debuted in July 1987. The station ran a simulcast on sister station 1340 AM beginning in the WBCS era, sporadically until 1997, when 1340 AM became the faith-based WJYI.

Even with Bob & Brian's success, during Lazer 103's last few years, the aging audience of Bob and Brian's show did not translate to listenership of the station's younger-skewing active rock format the rest of the day, as older listeners dispersed to the more work-appropriate offerings of sister station WKLH, or WKTI and other offerings after the show's end. Also in 2004, WLTQ suddenly dropped their light adult contemporary format and switched to 1980s-oriented classic rock as "97.3 The Brew", which also stripped listeners of WLZR post-Bob and Brian, along with WKLH. Management decided to rebuild the station around the demographic of their popular morning show, along with the general decline in the active rock format altogether at the time.

Classic rock (2005-present) 
On August 15, 2005, WLZR started stunting with wide-ranging music and teasers. They even played songs with the word "Jack" in them (in reference to the rapidly growing Jack FM format). The next day, just after 10:00, Bob and Brian signed off their morning show by signing on a new radio station -- "102-9 The Hog". The station re-imaged itself, dropped much of the younger-skewing rock music from bands like Slipknot, Mudvayne and Linkin Park, added more rock from the 1960s, 1970s and 1980s, and widely expanded their playlist. The new slogan was "Everything That Rocks", and serves as a harder rocking counterpart to its classic rock sister, WKLH.  Another slogan used to help change the station's image and to steal listeners from other stations included "Not Just the 80's, Everything That Rocks". The results of the image and playlist changes were immediate. "The Hog" soon eclipsed "The Brew" in the local ratings, eventually hastening their May 2010 conversion to Top 40 as WRNW.

The Hog's mascot hog was named "Dr. Squealgood" in a contest which is takeoff of a popular Mötley Crüe song: "Dr. Feelgood". The Hog branding's success has led to Janesville, Wisconsin station WWHG changing its branding to mirror WHQG's.

In recent years, WHQG's format shifted back towards active rock, similar to the former WLZR.

References

External links
102.9 The Hog official website

Bob and Brian's official website
Milwaukee radio: a retrospective
"Lazer 103 to change music format" (JSonline.com)
"The Hog offers no sentiment for Lazer" (JSonline.com)

HQG
Active rock radio stations in the United States